is a Japanese light novel series written by Isuna Hasekura, with illustrations by Jū Ayakura. ASCII Media Works has published 24 novels since February 2006 under their Dengeki Bunko imprint. ASCII Media Works reported that as of October 2008, over 2.2 million copies of the first nine novels have been sold in Japan. The series has been called a "unique fantasy" by Mainichi Shimbun due to the plot focusing on economics, trade, and peddling rather than the typical staples of fantasy such as swords and magic. Yen Press licensed the light novels and is releasing them in English in North America. ASCII Media Works has published five volumes of a spin-off light novel series titled Wolf and Parchment since September 2016.

A manga adaptation illustrated by Keito Koume began serialization in the November 2007 issue of ASCII Media Works' seinen manga magazine Dengeki Maoh. The manga was licensed by Yen Press, which has begun releasing the volumes in English. A 12-episode anime adaptation aired between January and March 2008, plus a single original video animation (OVA) episode released in May 2008. A second OVA was released in April 2009 as a prequel to the second anime season Spice and Wolf II, which aired 12 episodes between July and September 2009. Both anime seasons were released in English by Kadokawa Pictures USA and Funimation. Two visual novels based on the series for the Nintendo DS were released by ASCII Media Works in June 2008 and September 2009. A new anime adaptation has been announced.

Plot
Spice and Wolf'''s story revolves around Kraft Lawrence, a 25-year-old traveling merchant who peddles various goods from town to town to make a living in a stylized, fictional world, with a  historical setting with European influences. His main goal in life is to gather enough money to start his own shop, and he already has been traveling for seven years while gaining experience in the trade. One night when stopped at the town of Pasloe, he finds in his wagon a wolf-deity named Holo who is over 600 years old. She takes the form of a 15-year-old girl, except for a wolf's tail and ears. She introduces herself as the town's goddess of harvest, who has kept it blessed with good harvests of wheat for many years. Holo has experienced increasing isolation and disillusionment at the townpeople's move away from her protection towards their own methods of increasing the harvest.  She is especially hurt at their forgetting of the promise made between her and a farmer when she arrived in the village and their criticism of her as a "fickle god" for needing to replenish the soil with smaller harvests.  Because of these changes, she wants to go back to her homeland in the north called Yoitsu; she believes the people have already forsaken her and that she has kept her promise to maintain the good harvests. Holo also wants to travel to see how the world has changed while she has remained in one place for many years. She manages to bargain her way out of the village by making a deal with Lawrence to take her with him. As they travel, her wisdom helps increase his profits, but at the same time, her true nature draws unwanted attention from the Church.

Characters

Kraft Lawrence, who chiefly goes by 'Lawrence', is a 25-year-old traveling merchant who goes from town to town buying and selling various things in order to make a living. When he was twelve, he became an apprentice to a merchant relative, and set out on his own at eighteen. His goal in life is to gather enough money to start his own shop, and he has already been traveling for seven years while gaining experience in the trade. He meets Holo one night and eventually agrees to her traveling with him. She helps him by providing her wisdom which helps to increase his profits and get him out of jams. As the series progresses, both Lawrence and Holo demonstrate a growing affection toward each other. Although Lawrence rarely shows different facial expressions, he truly cares for Holo. He shows his affection through his actions, such as when Holo gets captured by the Church and Lawrence completely panics.

Holo is a wolf harvest deity originally from a place in the north known as Yoitsu, which draws parallels to the legendary land of Hyperborea. She made a promise with inhabitants from a town called Pasloe that she would ensure the town would have good wheat harvests year after year. However, as time went on, the townspeople slowly started to forsake Holo, regarding her as unnecessary, and resented the occasional bad harvests that Holo told Lawrence were necessary to rest the land. As such, Holo escapes from town in Lawrence's wagon and started traveling with him to see how much the world has changed since she has been in Pasloe. Holo has chosen the form of a 15-year old girl, though she still retains her large white-tipped wolf tail, ears, and two sharp fangs. At times she can produce an ear-shattering howl. Her true form is that of a very large wolf which many people feared. In the anime she as a wolf looks to be about 30 feet high from the ground to her shoulders in episode 1, and about 10 feet high in the sewer in episode 6. In the novels she is large enough to carry Lawrence like a horse, and she can easily leap the walls of Ruvinheigen, but is small enough to fit in Hans Remelio's office with Remelio and Lawrence. In human form, she has a peculiar way of speaking, modeled after that of the oiran high-class courtesans. She is able to speak to humans as a wolf. Holo is fond of delicious food and alcohol, but she always loves something new in each novel. In volume 1 it is apples. In volume 2 it is apples preserved in honey. In volume 3 it is eel (i.e. lamprey). She takes pride in her tail and takes special care of it, constantly combing and maintaining it. In the novel, volume 1, page 65, it is described as hanging past the back of her knees. In the anime it is longer and reaches nearly to her ankles.

She is typically very haughty and self-sufficient, though due to her isolation for hundreds of years in Pasloe, she gradually feels very lonely, and sometimes shows a more fragile side of herself. She relies on Lawrence for company as she fears loneliness, which is something that Lawrence is very aware of and tries to comfort her in his own way. Holo is also very aware of the different time spans that she and Lawrence have, as a human lifespan is like a blink of an eye for her kind. Holo is quite scared of that fact, but hides it with jokes. Although she jokes about her affections for Lawrence at first, she slowly but surely falls in love with him. At the end of the series, Holo settles down with Lawrence and they have a daughter, Myuri, who inherits her mother's traits and is the main character of the sequel light novel Wolf and Parchment.

Yarei is a light novel and manga-only character. He is a farmer of Pasloe and has a long history of facilitating deals with Lawrence. On the day Lawrence passes through Pasloe Yarei "catches the wolf" in the town's yearly harvest festival. Instead Holo escapes to a larger sheaf of wheat in Lawrence's wagon. When they meet again in Pazzio, Yarei certainly knows of the existence of Holo. He subsequently avows his faith in modern methods and seeks to turn her over to the Church for burning.

Chloe is an anime-original character. She is a villager of Pasloe and has known Lawrence for a long time. In fact, Lawrence taught her how to be a merchant. She had a slight interest in Lawrence, but tries to push the feelings away. Despite still not knowing how she should feel about him, she respects him as her teacher and a good friend. Their friendship is later broken when Chloe allies with the Church to capture Holo and Lawrence. She substitutes for Yarei in the anime both to fill the plothole in which Holo had no knowledge of Yarei but informed Lawrence of him nonetheless, and to deepen the drama when Chloe turned on Lawrence, her former teacher and old friend. In the anime when Chloe leads the sewer attack on Lawrence and Holo, Holo has a chance to kill Chloe, but refrains from doing so.

Nora makes her first appearance in volume two of the novels. She is a skilled shepherd from a church-town named Ruvinheigen. Her companion in this profession is a well-trained sheep dog named Enek (Enekk in the anime). Lawrence entrusts her with a difficult task of gold smuggling after they meet. 
After the mission is accomplished, Nora gains enough funds to emancipate herself from the Church.

Amarti, who like Lawrence mainly goes by his surname for business, makes his first appearance in volume three of the novels. He is a young man who works as a fish broker. He has a crush on Holo, and proposes to her. Due to Holo's good acting, he believes her to be gentle, kind and a soft spoken, polite young lady.

After listening to Holo's fake story of being Lawrence's traveling companion due to her owing him a (non-existent) huge debt, Amarti attempts to buy her liberty and win Holo over by publicly declaring a contractual deal with Lawrence in the merchant's guild. However, he loses almost everything emotionally and financially after the pyrite's price crash and Holo's dedication to stand by Lawrence. According to Marc, due to the methods in which he built his fortune, Amarti looks down on the connections and acquaintances forged by other merchants, and believes it shameful to make use of such connections to secure a deal.

Dian, who first appears in volume three of the novels, is a chronicler, living in Kumersun's walled ghetto with other "suspect" persons such as alchemists. She loves to collect Pagan tales and beliefs and has written them into a set of books.  Lawrence had come to her to ask for information about Holo's birthplace, Yoitsu. Since Dian sounds like a masculine name, Lawrence at first doesn't recognize her as the chronicler he seeks. Thus, she asks Lawrence to call her Dianna. According to Holo, Dian is not human, but a bird even bigger than Lawrence. She fell in love with a traveling priest and spent a few years helping him build a church, but left because he noticed that she never seemed to grow old and became suspicious. Due to her solemn and noble bearing and somewhat mature appearance, it can be logically assumed that she's possibly much older than Holo.

Her influence appears to be quite vast. As Marc states, she protects the alchemists living in the ghetto; anyone wanting to get to them has to go through her, a task implied to be incredibly difficult. As for the feathers scattered around her shop, it's not known if she transforms often, or simply has a pair of wings kept hidden by her robe, as does Holo with her ears and tail.

Marc Cole is a town merchant, a wheat seller in Kumersun.  He and his apprentice, Eu Landt, assist Lawrence in his contest with Amarti, and provide dialog counterpoint to Lawrence and Holo. Marc is roughly eight to ten years older than Lawrence and very proud of his little shop and his family. He strives to hold onto his good name for their sake, though he clearly goes to great lengths to help Lawrence in any way he can. He's also the first merchant in a long while that Lawrence comes to realize and accept as a true friend and not just a business associate.

Cloaked and shrouded in mysteries, Eve is a merchant from the port town of Lenos. Due to events in the past, this trader is wary of just about everyone and goes about her trade dressed as a man. Although hard to approach, Eve is talkative under the right circumstances and has a keen eye for people and business alike. She is in fact a fallen noble that was once sold as a bride to another merchant after her family's fall. She slowly laundered money from him and when he died, she started her own business. She organized a secret smuggling operation with the church then left it after she felt that they don't need her cooperation anymore then made a contract with Lawrence. Her real name is Fleir von Eiterzental Mariel Boland.

Media
Light novelsSpice and Wolf began as a light novel series written by Isuna Hasekura, with illustrations by Jū Ayakura. Originally, Hasekura entered the first novel in the series into ASCII Media Works' twelfth Dengeki Novel Prize in 2005 and the novel won the Silver Prize. ASCII Media Works published 17 novels between February 10, 2006 and July 10, 2011 under their Dengeki Bunko imprint. The tagline for the novels is "Merchant meats spicy wolf.", an example of Engrish. The author of the novels has commented that what "meats" in the tagline really means is kept a secret, alluding to a possible intentional misspelling of "meets". In celebration of the series' 10th anniversary, Hasekura began writing a sequel in the 49th volume of Dengeki Bunko Magazine, released on April 9, 2016. In 2016, publication of new books in the series resumed with the release of the eighteenth volume, along with the start of a spin-off series titled Wolf and Parchment: New Theory Spice & Wolf, focusing on the characters Cole and Myuri, Lawrence and Holo's daughter.

In September 2008, the novels were licensed by Yen Press for distribution in English. The first volume was released in December 2009, and a new volume was released every four months. While Yen Press redesigned the cover of the first novel, a dust jacket retaining the original cover art was released to select online retailers, and Yen Press also bundled the same jacket in the December 2009 issue of their manga anthology magazine Yen Plus. Despite the different cover art, the illustrations within the novels remain unchanged. Yen Press later announced that future volumes of the series and reprints of the first volume would retain the original artwork while dust jackets would carry the new covers, citing that the redesigned covers were requested by retailers in order to appeal to a wider audience. Yen Press has also licensed the Wolf and Parchment series, with the first volume released in November 2017.

Manga

A manga adaptation illustrated by Keito Koume began serialization in the November 2007 issue of ASCII Media Works' seinen manga magazine Dengeki Maoh. The first tankōbon volume was released by ASCII Media Works under their Dengeki Comics imprint on March 27, 2008; 16 volumes have been published as of February 2018. Yen Press licensed the manga series at New York Comic Con 2009, and began releasing the series in English in North America.

A manga adaption of Wolf and Parchment by Hidori began serialization in the July 2019 issue of Dengeki Maoh.

Internet radio shows
An Internet radio show hosted by Animate called  aired ten episodes between December 7, 2007 and April 25, 2008. One episode was broadcast every other week on Friday, and the show was meant to mainly promote the anime series. The show is hosted by Jun Fukuyama who plays Kraft Lawrence in the anime, and Ami Koshimizu who plays Holo. The show contains eight corners, or parts to each broadcast which includes news about the series, comments and submissions from listeners, and a radio drama. A second radio show titled Ōkamikku Radio II aired ten episodes between June 10 and October 28, 2009 with the same producer and hosts.

Anime

An anime adaptation produced by the animation studio Imagin aired in Japan between January 9 and March 26, 2008 on the Chiba TV Japanese television network; twelve of the thirteen episodes were broadcast, with episode seven being a DVD exclusive. The episodes are being released in six DVD compilation volumes in Japan; volume one contains three episodes while the subsequent volumes contain two episodes each. The volumes were released between April 2, 2008 and August 29, 2008 by Pony Canyon in Japan; volume three contains an original video animation (OVA) episode in addition to episode six of the television broadcast. A Blu-ray Disc box set of the series was released on January 30, 2009. The series is directed by Takeo Takahashi, written by Naruhisa Arakawa, and character designs are provided by Kazuya Kuroda. Takahashi was quoted as being a big fan of the novels. The anime's original soundtrack was released on March 12, 2008. The anime is licensed for release in English by Kadokawa Pictures USA and Funimation Entertainment, and a complete thirteen-episode DVD box set was released on December 22, 2009. The series made its North American television debut on November 16, 2010 on the Funimation Channel.

A second season of the anime titled Spice and Wolf II aired twelve episodes in Japan between July 9 and September 24, 2009. Most of the staff from the first season returned, except for Toshimitsu Kobayashi replacing Kazuya Kuroda as the character designer and chief animation director, and Spice and Wolf II is animated by Brain's Base and Marvy Jack instead of Imagin. The voice actors from the first season retained their roles. Another OVA, animated by Brain's Base and Marvy Jack, was released bundled with a picture book entitled  written and illustrated by the same creators of the light novels and was released by ASCII Media Works on April 30, 2009 under their Dengeki Bunko Visual Novel imprint. Funimation licensed Spice and Wolf II and released the series in English on August 30, 2011. The second season made its North American television debut on August 31, 2011 on the Funimation Channel. On September 11, 2012, Funimation released a Blu-ray/DVD combo pack of both seasons. The April 30, 2009 OVA is included on the season two disc as episode 00. 

A new anime adaptation was announced on February 25, 2022, as part of the novel's 15-year anniversary.

Video games
A dating and business simulation visual novel based on the series, Spice and Wolf: Holo's and My One Year, was developed by ASCII Media Works for the Nintendo DS, and was released on June 26, 2008 in Japan. It never had an official Western release, but received a fan translation into English by AGT Team on February 20, 2021 under the localized title Spice and Wolf: My Year With Holo. The player assumes the role of a nameless character (the titular "Boku", who closely resembles Kraft Lawrence) as he travels around with Holo for a period of one year in the game. The story differs from that of the original novels or anime, and is presented as an alternate universe. Ami Koshimizu provides the voice of Holo in the game. The game was released on the same day in limited and regular editions; the limited edition was sold at a higher price, but comes with a life-sized poster of Holo, among other things.

A sequel, also by ASCII Media Works for Nintendo DS, was released on September 17, 2009 in Japan, titled Spice and Wolf: The Wind that Spans the Sea. The player once again assumes the role of Kraft Lawrence. A fan translation of the game into English has been done by the AGT Team.

A virtual reality adventure game titled Spice and Wolf VR and made by Spicy Tails, a dōjin group founded by Isuna Hasekura, was released on June 3, 2019 for Microsoft Windows supporting the Oculus Rift and HTC Vive VR headsets as well as the standalone Oculus Go headset. It was later released for the Nintendo Switch and PlayStation 4 on September 5, 2019, supporting the Nintendo Labo VR Kit and PlayStation VR respectively. A port to the Oculus Quest headset was released in November 2019. Its sequel, Spice and Wolf VR2, was released on December 10, 2020.
Reception
ASCII Media Works reported that as of November 2009, over 3.5 million copies of the first twelve novels have been sold. The light novel series has ranked three times in Takarajimasha's light novel guide book Kono Light Novel ga Sugoi! published yearly: first in 2007, and fifth in both 2008 and 2009; in the 2007 issue, Holo won Best Female Character. The first manga volume of the English release in North America debuted at No. 4 on the New York Times Best Seller Manga list, while the third volume reached at No. 3.

In April 2008, the maid café Cafe with Cat in Akihabara, Tokyo, Japan hosted a specially themed event called Cafe with Wolf for a period of three days between April 4 and April 6. The event included three new items on the menu and tied in with the sale of the first anime DVD volume which went on sale on April 2, 2008. People who bought the DVD from the Comic Toranoana Akihabara Honten store (which is on the first floor below Cafe with Cat) and brought the receipt with them into Cafe with Wolf were entered into a lottery to win rare Spice and Wolf goods.

Notes and references
Footnotes

Citations

External links
  
 10th anniversary website 
 Spice and Wolf VR official website 
 Spice and Wolf light novels at Yen Press
 https://www.crunchyroll.com/spice-and-wolf Spice and Wolf'' anime] at Crunchyroll
 

2006 Japanese novels
2007 manga
2008 anime OVAs
2008 anime television series debuts
2009 anime OVAs
2009 anime television series debuts
2016 Japanese novels
Anime and manga based on light novels
ASCII Media Works games
ASCII Media Works manga
Kadokawa Dwango franchises
Brain's Base
Crunchyroll anime
Dengeki Bunko
Dengeki Comics
Fantasy anime and manga
Japanese serial novels
Light novels
Romance anime and manga
Seinen manga
Television series about wolves
Yen Press titles